St. George Lutheran Church is a historic Lutheran church located in Jackson Township, Shelby County, Indiana.

The congregation was established by Abraham Miller in 1838, meeting at first in George Warner's farmhouse. The first dedicated church was completed in 1844 on the current site. In 1867, the members sold the frame church to a Baptist group and pledged $5000 to build the current structure.

Architecture
Completed in 1867, the current church is a one-story, rectangular, Greek Revival style building of local brick. It has a gable-front roof and features round-arched openings. The roof is topped by a square bell tower with a steeply pitched hipped roof; the bell was cast at the Buckeye Foundry in Cincinnati. The church's stained and etched glass windows were imported from Germany.

It was listed on the National Register of Historic Places in 1984.

References

Lutheran churches in Indiana
Churches on the National Register of Historic Places in Indiana
Greek Revival church buildings in Indiana
Churches completed in 1867
National Register of Historic Places in Shelby County, Indiana
Religious organizations established in 1838